James Munro (23 January 1870 – 4 January 1899) was a Scottish footballer who played at inside forward in the 1890s.

Career 
He played in The Football League for Bolton Wanderers and Burton Swifts, and later played for Swindon Town.

Whilst at Swindon he also played half back, centre half, full back and on one occasion played in goal. He was made club captain when Swindon turned professional and was first professional player to play for the team earning 35 shillings a week.

Death 

Munro died suddenly of meningitis on 4 January 1899. A few days before on New Year's Eve he had led Swindon in a 4–3 win against Tottenham in a Southern League match. Afterwards he was unwell and thought to have caught a cold, however he died shortly after. He was survived by his wife Helena Anne and five-month old daughter. Thousands turned out to watch his funeral procession which was led by the New Swindon Town Military Band and went from his home in Kent Road to the Trinity Presbyterian Church. He was buried in Radnor Street Cemerery in Swindon where a memorial was later erected. In 2021 a group of Swindon Town fans raised £1,500 to restore his memorial.

References

External links 

 Swindon Town FC player profile

1870 births
1899 deaths
Association football inside forwards
English Football League players
Bolton Wanderers F.C. players
Burton Swifts F.C. players
Swindon Town F.C. players
Scottish footballers